This article lists the results for the Thailand national football team between 1980 and 1989.

 Only record the results that affect the FIFA/Coca-Cola World Ranking. See FIFA 'A' matches criteria.

1980

1981

1982

1983

1984

1985

1986

1987

1988

1989

External links
 Football Association of Thailand 
 Thai Football.com
 Thai football page of Fifa.com
 Thai football Blog

1980
1980s in Thai sport